The 1963 Dominican coup d'état was a Coup d'état that took place on 25 September 1963 against President Juan Bosch in the Dominican Republic.

Coup 
President Juan Bosch, the first democratically elected president in the Dominican Republic after the fall of the dictatorship of Rafael Leonidas Trujillo, and was overthrown on 25 September 1963 after only seven months in power. The coup was led by Generals Elías Wessin y Wessin and Antonio Imbert Barreras, accusing Bosch and his cabinet of being ''corrupt and pro-Communist" and replacing them with a three-man military junta. Bosch went to exile in Puerto Rico.

Reactions 
The United States condemned the coup, suspending aid to the country and refusing to recognize the military junta.

Aftermath 

Less than two years later, growing dissatisfaction generated another military rebellion on 24 April 1965 that demanded Bosch's restoration. The insurgents, commanded by Colonel Francisco Caamaño, removed the junta from power on April 28. The United States dispatched 22,000 troops to the island in Operation Power Pack during the ensuing civil war, occupying Santo Domingo for several months while a provisional government was formed and elections were organized.

An interim government was formed and elections were scheduled for 1 July 1966. Bosch returned to the country and ran as his party's presidential candidate. However, he ran a somewhat muted campaign, fearing for his safety and believing he would be thrown out of office by the military again if he won. He was defeated by Joaquín Balaguer, who garnered 57% of the vote. The last American troops left in September 1966.

References 

Dominican Republic
Coup d'état
1963
September 1963 events in North America
Conflicts in 1963